Çiğil can refer to:

 Çiğil, Kastamonu
 Çiğil, Silvan